The Greek Motorway A65, often referred to as the Egaleo Ring Road, is a motorway in Athens. Part of the Attiki Odos highway system, it branches off the main A6, serving western Athens. It is named after the Egaleo mountain range it runs parallel to.

The motorway was supposed to serve as a connector road with National Road 8. It however remains unfinished as the construction of its southernmost 1.4 km section near Skaramagas has been blocked by controversies.

Exit list

65
Roads in Attica